An approximately 20-person team at Ion Storm developed Deus Ex, a cyberpunk-themed action-role playing video game, over the course of 34 months, culminating in a June 2000 release. Team director and producer Warren Spector began to plan the game in 1993 after releasing Ultima Underworld II with Origin Systems and attempted the game both there and at Looking Glass Technologies before going into production with Ion Storm. Official preproduction began around August 1997, lasted for six months, and was followed by 28 months of production. Spector saw their work as expanding on the precedent set by Origin, Looking Glass, and Valve.

In preproduction, six people from Looking Glass's Austin studios focused on the setting ahead of the game mechanics, and chose a story centred around prominent conspiracy theories as an expression of the "millennial madness" in The X-Files and Men in Black. Spector felt that the development process's highlights were the "high-level vision" and length of preproduction, flexibility within the project, testable "proto-missions", and Unreal Engine license. Their pitfalls included the team structure, unrealistic goals, underestimating risks with artificial intelligence, their handling of proto-missions, and weakened morale from Daikatana bad press. The game was published by Eidos Interactive and released on June 23, 2000 for Windows 95 and later versions, whereupon it earned over 30 "best of" awards in 2001.

Preproduction 

 After Warren Spector released Ultima Underworld II with Origin Systems in January 1993, he began to plan Troubleshooter, the game that would become Deus Ex. Noting his wife's fascination with The X-Files, he connected the "real world, millennial weirdness, [and] conspiracy stuff" topics on his mind and decided to make a game about it that would appeal to a wider audience. He also considered cyberpunk influences that came from around 1978 when he was participating in a themed Dungeons & Dragons campaign created and led by Bruce Sterling, who had adapted that campaign based on the choice Spector and the other players made. Troubleshooter, in contrast to the other games he had been making at Origin, would have been a "real-world role-playing game", relying more on player choices and assuring that every player could reach the end of the game but in the manner they choose.

In his 1994 proposal to Origin, he described the concept as "Underworld-style first-person action" in a real-world setting with "big-budget, nonstop action" starring an ex-cop "security specialist". He described the project as "high" risk for its "technological unknowns" as "probably the toughest project on his wish list". It failed to get to production. He later left Origin for Looking Glass Technologies near the time that they were producing Thief: The Dark Project, but kept the idea in mind. For Thief, he tried to suggest buffing the character more so that the player could opt to fight through levels instead of sneaking, the original intent of the game, but the team didn't take to these ideas. He continued to change his character and game system plans for Troubleshooter, though the game he then called Junction Point did not reach production at Looking Glass. Spector wrote that the timing was not yet ripe because the business teams were not interested, the technology was not yet feasible, he did not have an interested team or the resources to make one, and that publishers did not want a "first-person, cross-genre game". Spector, himself, was also tired of unrealistic fantasy and alien settings. Frustrated at Looking Glass, Spector sought employment elsewhere and was nearly about to sign a contract with Electronic Arts, when John Romero of Ion Storm approached him. When Romero offered him a chance to make his "dream game" without any restrictions, Spector was immediately on board.

Preproduction began around August 1997 and lasted about six months. The six-person team came from Looking Glass's Austin studios. Spector, the team's director and producer, saw their work as improving upon the foundation provided by Origin, Looking Glass, and Valve by doing what those companies did not. The game's working title was Shooter: Majestic Revelations, with a scheduled release of Christmas 1998. The working title was meant to be ironic because they did not want the game to be solely a first-person shooter. They worked on the setting ahead of the game mechanics, and decided on a conspiracy-style story that referenced existing conspiracy theories such as Area 51, CIA drug trafficking, the John F. Kennedy assassination, the Majestic 12, and a Masonic underground bunker beneath Denver International Airport. Spector said their research helped them understand how conspiracy theorists think. The team was also able to look to the real world in 1997 to find the rise of stories about terrorists and mechanically-augmented soldiers that they were able to build upon. They also used this time to work out the backstory for constancy. The team designed over 200 characters without associated in-game roles, which was both helpful when designing missions and unhelpful as they attempted to reduce their scope. In the third quarter of 1997, Spector wrote a "manifesto" on his ideal game and the "rules of role-playing" that was later published in the February 1999 Game Developer magazine. His principles included "problems, not puzzles", "no forced failure", "players do; NPCs watch", and "areas with multiple entrance and exit points". Reflecting, Spector felt that Deus Ex accomplished the intent of his manifesto.
 
The Shooter design document set the player as an augmented agent working against an elite cabal in the "dangerous and chaotic" 2050s. Its subtitle was "roleplaying in a world of secrets, lies, and conspiracies". It was written to be similar in concept to Half-Life, Fallout, Thief: The Dark Project, and GoldenEye 007, and to mix elements of the films Colossus: The Forbin Project, The Manchurian Candidate, and RoboCop in a world inspired by The X-Files and Men in Black—examples of "the millennial madness that's gripping the world ... and a general fascination with conspiracy theories and the desire to play with high-tech espionage toys".

The preproduction team also tweaked the game systems. They chose a skill system that used nanotechnology augmentation, unique to the player character, as "special powers" instead of "die-rolls" or skills that required granular management. They also built a conversation structure based on console role-playing game setups, and drafted the augmentation upgrade, inventory, and skill screens. They also designed an in-game text editor for taking notes, and "reward systems" for skill points, reduced weapon and tool cooldowns, and augmentation upgrades. Preproduction had generated 300 pages of documentation by March 1998. The document grew to 500 pages with "radically different" content by their April 1999 Alpha 1 deadline. Of Spector's original design document, the marketing section was the only part left unedited.

Production 

In early 1998, after six months of preproduction, the Deus Ex project grew to a 20-person team and entered a 28-month production phase. Spector hired new staff in their Austin studio and was also assigned a Dallas-based art team. The development team consisted of three programmers, six designers, seven artists, a writer, an associate producer, a tech, plus two writers and four testers as contractors. Chris Norden was the lead programmer and assistant director, Harvey Smith the lead designer, Jay Lee the lead artist, Sheldon Pacotti the lead writer, and Spector producer and director.

The team had many disagreements, and Spector's original staff setup crumbled. When two experienced designers vied for the lead designer position, Spector chose both and made two design teams: the "Looking Glass design team" or "immersive simulation group" led by Harvey Smith (System Shock, Ultima VIII: Pagan) and the "Ultima roleplaying team" or "traditional roleplaying group" led by Robert White (Ultima Online, Ultima IX: Ascension as "Bob White"). He initially thought their competition would be easily managed and fruitful, but neither team felt second to the other and Spector had to merge the teams and choose a single designer, Smith, to lead it. He felt that the matrix management structure under which the Dallas art team worked for the project but were not the project's staff hurt the game's progress. Some of the artists were not interested in Deus Ex, and Spector wrote that "the art department drifted a bit". He said that the matrix management structure created tension and problems, and was generally against the idea due to how it worked at his previous studios Origin and Looking Glass. Though his stance won out and the project received dedicated artists, Spector lamented that the game could have been improved for not having matrix management in the first place. He wrote that he learned about the importance of team member personal investment in the game, the preemptive benefits of addressing personnel concerns as they arise, and the usefulness of a chain of command even when consensus works.

Spector described the team as interested in multiple genres of gaming, consisting of both maximalists who wanted to "do everything" and minimalists who wanted to do few things well. Close friends who understood the team's intents were invited to test the game and give feedback. The wide range of input led to debates in the office and changes in the game. In his postmortem, Spector concluded that the team was "unrealistic, blinded by promises of complete creative freedom" and by "assurances" of budget, marketing, and no time restraints, which he called "seductive traps". By mid-1998, the game's title had become Deus Ex, from the Latin literary device deus ex machina ("god from the machine") whereby an impossible plot is resolved by an unpredictable intervention. Spector acknowledged its grammatical faults as a title and added that he liked it because of the in-game struggle for power, the reference to the medium's own plot difficulties, the reference to the game inside a computer machine, and the "self-referential" acceptance of trying one's best to resolve affairs. The game was published by Eidos Interactive and released on June 23, 2000 for Windows 95 and later versions. They also planned third-party ports for Mac OS 9 and Linux.

Spector felt that the development process's highlights were the "high-level vision" and length of preproduction, flexibility within the project, testable "proto-missions", and Unreal Engine license. Their pitfalls included the team structure, unrealistic goals, underestimating risks with artificial intelligence, their handling of proto-missions, and weakened morale from bad press. He referred to that period of Ion Storm as "Sturm und Drang" with its degree of hype and as a target of vitriol following Daikatana "suck it down" trash talk marketing and what Spector saw as negative press in 1998 and 1999. He said that his Austin team had "frequent" slumps in morale from taking the company's coverage personally and seeing their private emails posted online. Spector wrote that "too many talented people" interested in Deus Ex did not join because they refused to work at Ion Storm. He added that the company's notoriety did contribute to their press coverage from major outlets, more so than during his time at Origin or Looking Glass. Eventually, the Deus Ex Austin team developed a we'll show them' mentality" to distinguish their work and reputation from the Dallas-based Daikatana and Anachronox Ion Storm releases, which Spector considered toxic.

World and character design 

The original 1997 design document for the game privileges character development over all other parts, including experimental sequences and technology demos. They wanted players to consider "who they wanted to be" in the game, and for that to be connected to how they behaved in the game. In this way, the game world was "deeply simulated": real and common sense enough to be believed that the player may think about solving the game problems in creative and emergent ways without seeing distinct puzzles. The developers also wanted "choice" with "consequence"—what Spector called the team's "two most frequently uttered words". Their simulation was not able to maintain that level of openness, and the team had to force "skill", "action", and "character interaction" paths through the levels. Spector compared this technique to the practices of Ultima developers, though he felt his team did it "more consciously and ... effectively". Spector later credited Konami's 1995 role-playing video game Suikoden as an inspiration, stating that the limited choices in Suikoden inspired him to expand on the idea with more meaningful choices in Deux Ex.

The game changed greatly over the course of production, but parts that remained consistent include the augmented counterterrorist protagonist JC Denton. The anti-terrorism organization UNATCO was originally TLC, the Terrorist Limitation Coalition. Ally Tracer Tong was more of a "mercenary" than a "kindly anarchist", while enemies like UNATCO's Joseph Manderley went from "ruthless bastard" to "stuffy bureaucrat" and Majestic 12's Bob Page and assassin Anna Navarre played more of a background role. Many of the original character ideas were reshaped to fit the final game design. The Majestic 12 organization originally intended to initiate a Mexican invasion of Texas and then suffocate the presidential cabinet by killing their oxygen supply. When this failed, their artificial intelligence kills the organization and retreats to outer space with nuclear weapons. Some of the plot and characters were brought to the final version, except that Majestic 12 is clandestine and focused on controlling the Internet. Though Spector originally pictured the game as akin to The X-Files, lead writer Sheldon Pacotti felt it ended up more like James Bond. Spector himself called the game "James Bond meets The X-Files". He wrote that the team overextended itself by planning such elaborate scenes, especially parts such as a replica of downtown Austin, Area 51 reconstructed from satellite data, a sunken post-earthquake Los Angeles, a raid to free thousands of prisoners of war from a Federal Emergency Management Agency-controlled United Nations concentration camp, and over 25 missions throughout Siberia, western Europe, and the United States.

 Designer Harvey Smith suggested a streamlined plot that removed the Mexican invasion to make development easier and the narrative more personal. While finished assets were repurposed, entire parts of the game were abandoned, including Texas and the Denver airport. Environments such as a flooded city became a Majestic 12 research site and the endgame Helios space station became Area 51. He also made the call to remove a playable mid-game White House level due to its complexity and production needs in other areas. Pete Davison of USgamer referred to the White House and presidential bunker as "the truly deleted scenes of Deus Ex lost levels". Spector referred to his "dream" level—the White House—as their "toughest map challenge". The team has speculated that the assets may exist on a "DVDs in someone's attic", though Pacotti, Smith, Spector, and the final release have no trace of them. Pacotti felt that the experience of rescuing Paul was worth cutting the White House from the game.

Testing revealed that their idea of a role-playing game based in the real world was more interesting in theory than actuality. They chose two real-world inspirations for levels: "highly interconnected, multi-level" spaces and places one cannot normally visit (such as the White House). In practice, they felt that some functions of the real world, such as hotels and office buildings, were not compelling in a game, and that "reality" always lost when up against "fun". Their recreations of notable locations and items such as the Statue of Liberty and payphones were questioned when they did not emulate the actual site or function. Internally, the team began to doubt their investment in a non-player character-driven game as sufficiently interesting. Spector was swayed by this widespread sentiment to have "monsters and bad guys", and the team increased the prominence of several robots and added genetically-altered animals that still fit the story.

Design 

The game was designed to be "genre-busting"—partly simulation, role-playing game, first-person shooter, and adventure. Spector intended for Deus Ex to be an "immersive simulation" similar to Ultima Underworld by removing reminders of the game world such as interface or backstory. He described the game's role-playing elements as the player-character becomes a "unique alter ego" built from the ramifications of their unique gameplay decisions. Similar to a first-person shooter, the game uses a first-person perspective and includes shooting, but there are other non-violent gameplay options. Like an adventure game, Deux Ex is primarily based on a linear narrative story and item collection, though its puzzles are open-ended with many possible solutions and consequences. Ion Storm felt the game was about player expression rather than the appearance of the developers' ingenuity, and wanted to treat the player as a "collaborator" that they could empower to make choices and deal with consequences.

Once implemented, the team's game systems did not work as intended. They built prototypes of the systems and some missions towards the beginning of development, which uncovered some of their blind spots. For example, their early implementation of the conversation system and user interface afforded them enough time to revise by the final release. They also found the augmentations and skills to not be as interesting in implementation as they seemed in the design document. Developers from other companies, such as Doug Church, Rob Fermier, Marc LeBlanc, and Gabe Newell, identified these deficiencies in game "tension" when they played the prototype. This led to a substantial revision of the augmentations and skills; Smith designed an augmentation per-use "energy cost" that led to energy refill rewards and more tactical play.

Their milestones served as wake-up calls for the game's direction. A May 1998 "proto-mission" milestone was to have a basic but functional demo of the crucial game systems and two maps (the White House and Hong Kong) ready. The team worked on the riskiest parts of the game first such that the core game would be functioning, albeit not polished. The demo revealed that the size of their maps caused performance problems and would have to be divided into smaller maps. It also was one of the first signs that maps needed to be cut. The team forgot to prototype the non-player character artificial intelligence in this demo. A year later, in May 1999, they reached a milestone for finished game systems and the first two missions completed. While the player could start the game and character, use augmentations, acquire inventory, complete objectives, and save the game, their poor quality and comments from Newell led Spector to nickname the milestone the "Wow, these missions suck" milestone. They felt that their first demos showed their potential, but they were not nearly close to reaching it. This milestone also helped them estimate the work required for missions and the portions that worked best, which led to a trim of their 500-page design manual to the best 270 pages. Spector recalled Smith's mantra here: "less is more". 

Smith had "an intimacy" with the level design tools such that he could sense when the design met the game's technical restrictions, like the maximum possible size or number of characters for a room. He suggested the narrower skill tree with palpable effects, such as exchanging skills about weapon damage for more accessible weapons. The team adopted the cuts, having been encouraged by the recent milestone. Spector has said that had they waited for the beta to have made the same reductions (as per common practice), "it would have been a disaster." Spector's post-proto-mission strategy was to bring the rest of the missions to proto-mission functionality rather than perfecting the two existing proto-missions. He felt that this would be a more efficient use of staff time, even if it meant that the final product would be more "bare-bones" than brilliant. Almost all of their game systems besides the inventory and conversation schemes were rethought up through the end of the project.

They also made choices about the minutiae of game mechanics. The team chose to pause the action while the player was viewing interfaces as to keep the strategy tactical, and to make the affinity of strangers and purpose of items "instantly recognizable". Spector said that the issue of naming the player-character almost incited a "holy war", though they compromised and let the player choose in exchange for a common "code name and backstory". They also saved the cinematic cutscene work for last so as not to repeat work as things changed during development.

Spector wrote that the team did not figure out how to handle NPC AI until late in development. This led to wasted time as the team discarded their early AI. They were also building atop their game engine's shooter-based AI instead of building a customized version anew to handle the spectrum of convincing emotions they wanted from their characters. As a result, NPC behavior was variable until the very end of development. Spector felt that their "sin" was their inconsistent display of a trustable "human AI".

Technology 

 The game was developed on systems including dual-processor Pentium Pro 200s and Athlon 800s with eight and nine-gigabyte hard drives, some using SCSI. The team used "more than 100 video cards" throughout development. Deus Ex was built using Visual Studio, Lightwave, and Lotus Notes. The team also built a custom dialogue editor, ConEdit. They used UnrealEd atop the Unreal game engine for map design, which Spector wrote was "superior to anything else available". Their trust in UnrealScript led them to code "special cases" for their immediate mission needs instead of more generalized multi-case code. Even as team members expressed concern, the team only addressed this later in the project. To Spector, this was a lesson to always prefer "general solutions" over "special casing", such that the tool set works predictably.

They waited to license a game engine until after preproduction, expecting the benefits of licensing to be more time for the content and gameplay. They chose the Unreal engine as it did 80% of what they needed from an engine and was more economical than building from scratch. Their small programming team allowed for a larger design group. The programmers also found the engine accommodating, though it took about nine months to acclimate to the software. Spector estimated that six to nine months of playing with the engine were necessary to learn how to use it properly, and even still, their ideas did not always implement as planned. Spector thought it would have been much harder to have written the interfaces, skill systems, and conversations on their own. Despite the savings, the time Spector thought they would save not writing an engine was lost learning the engine, though they did have more time to work on content creation and gameplay systems. Spector also felt that they would have understood the code better had they built it themselves, instead of "treating the engine as a black box" and coding conservatively. He acknowledged that this precipitated into the Direct3D issues in their final release, which slipped through their quality assurance testing. Spector also noted that the artificial intelligence, pathfinding, and sound propagation were designed for shooters and should have been rewritten from scratch instead of relying on the engine. He thought the licensed engine worked well enough that he expected to use the same for the game's sequel and Thief 3. He added that developers should not attempt to force their technology to perform in ways it was not intended, and should find a balance between perfection and pragmatism.

Post-release 

Though their quality assurance did not see major Direct3D issues, players noted "dramatic slowdowns" immediately following launch, and the team did not understand the "black box" of the Unreal engine well enough to make it do exactly what they needed. Spector characterized Deus Ex reviews into two categories based on how they begin with either how "Warren Spector makes games all by himself" or that "Deus Ex couldn't possibly have been made by Ion Storm". He has said that the game won over 30 "best of" awards in 2001, and concluded that their final game was not perfect, but that they were much closer for having tried to "do things right or not at all".

References

Notes

References

Sources

 

Deus Ex
Deus Ex
Deus Ex